Unstoppable (Spanish: Desenfrenadas) is a Mexican drama streaming television series that premiered on Netflix on 28 February 2020. It stars Tessa Ía, Bárbara López, Lucía Uribe, and Coty Camacho.

The series was created and produced by Diego Martínez Ulanosky. Ulanosky also directed seven of the episodes with the other three directed by Julio Hernández Cordón and Elisa Miller.

Plot 
The series revolves around three wealthy friends, Rocío, Vera, and Carlota, who decide to take a road trip to Oaxaca and on the way meet a stranger who changes their lives.

Cast 
 Tessa Ía as Vera, a carefree fashion blogger 
 Bárbara López as Rocío, a doctor
 Lucía Uribe as Carlota, a Jewish feminist blogger  
 Coty Camacho as Marcela, a petty criminal on the run from her boss and ex-boyfriend
 Fernando Ciangherotti as Ignacio, Rocío's doctor father
 Tomás Ruiz as Juanpi, Rocío's fiancé
 Camila Valero as Sofía, Rocío's deceased sister and former ballerina
 Diego Calva as Joshua, Marcela's ex-boyfriend
 Gabriel Chávez as Sapo, a drug dealer on the lookout for Marcela

Episodes

References

External links 
 

2020 Mexican television series debuts
Mexican drama television series
Spanish-language Netflix original programming
Television shows set in Mexico City